The Saint Lucia Labour Party (SLP) is a social democratic political party in Saint Lucia. It currently holds 13 of the 17 seats in the House of Assembly.

History
The party was established in 1949, backed by the Saint Lucia Workers Cooperative Union. In the first elections held under universal suffrage in 1951, and led by party founder George Charles, the party won five of the eight seats. It retained all five seats in the 1954 elections, and increased their majority to seven of the eight seats in 1957 and nine of the ten seats in 1961.

In 1964, the party lost an election for the first time, with the United Workers Party, born out of a schism from within the Labour Party led by John Compton and eventual merger of the breakaway faction with the People's Progressive Party, winning six of the ten seats, with the Labour Party reduced to two. It gained a seat in the 1969 elections, and increased their representation to seven seats in 1974, although the UWP remained in power as the total number of seats rose to 17.

The Labour Party returned to power after winning the 1979 elections (12/17), led by Allan Louisy, replaced as Prime Minister during the term by Winston Cenac, himself replaced by Michael Pilgrim. The 1979 elections were the first elections held following independence from the United Kingdom, declared on 22 February 1979.

It lost the 1982 elections to Compton's UWP when they were reduced to just two seats, challenged on their left by a breakaway faction, George Odlum's Progressive Labour Party taking 1 seat. It remained in opposition following the two elections of April 1987, increasing its presence to 8 seats in both contests, and in 1992 (6/17).

Led by Dr. Kenny Anthony, former cabinet minister in the 1979–1982 government, it won the 1997 elections, taking 16 of the 17 seats. It remained in power after the 2001 elections (14/17).

It lost the 2006 elections to the UWP, who had called back John Compton as leader a year before - he had retired in 1996. Kenny Anthony remained leader of the party throughout its time as loyal opposition. The Labour Party won the 2011 Saint Lucian general election (28 November 2011), winning in 11 out of a 17-seats contest and defeating UWP leader Stephenson King who had succeeded John Compton as Prime Minister (d. 2007, in office).

The Labour Party lost the 2016 elections to the UWP by 11 seats to 6, and Kenny Anthony resigned as party leader. Former Deputy PM Philip J. Pierre was confirmed as party leader on 18 June 2016.

Saint Lucia Labour Party Prime Ministers

Electoral history

House of Assembly elections

References

External links
Official website

Former member parties of the Socialist International
Labour parties
Political parties in Saint Lucia
Socialist parties in North America